The Telavi Ministry was the 13th ministry of the Government of Tuvalu, led by Prime Minister Willy Telavi.  It succeeded the Second Toafa Ministry upon its swearing in by Governor-General Iakoba Italeli on 24 December 2010 after a vote of no confidence in former Prime Minister Maatia Toafa. Following Telavi's removal as prime minister, his ministry was subsequently brought down by the opposition's vote of no confidence and was succeeded by the Sopoaga Ministry, led by Enele Sopoaga, on 5 August 2013.

Cabinet

Changes to the Ministry

2011 changes
Isaia Italeli, Minister for Works and Natural Resources, died suddenly on 19 July 2011, while attending a regional meeting in Apia, Samoa. In August, his widow, Pelenike Isaia, was elected to his seat in Parliament in a by-election in the constituency of Nui, thereby saving the government's parliamentary majority. She was subsequently appointed to Cabinet as Minister for Home Affairs. She is the second woman in Parliament, and in Cabinet, in Tuvalu's history. Prime Minister Telavi took on the role of Minister for Works and Natural Resources.

2012 changes
On 21 December 2012, Finance Minister Lotoala Metia died in turn, in hospital, of unspecified causes. As a by-election was not called until June 2013, he was not replaced.

2013 changes
Health Minister Taom Tanukale resigned unexpectedly from government on 30 July, when parliament was reconvened by the governor-general. Telavi's ministry was subsequently voted out of office three days later thus he was not replaced.

References

Tuvaluan politicians
2010 in Tuvalu
2011 in Tuvalu
2012 in Tuvalu
2013 in Tuvalu
Politics of Tuvalu
Ministries of Elizabeth II